Datuk Seri Mahadi bin Che Ngah is a Malaysian civil servant who became the 13th and current mayor of Kuala Lumpur since 2020.

Honours
 :
 Grand Commander of the Order of the Territorial Crown (S.M.W.) – Datuk Seri (2021)

References 

Mayors of Kuala Lumpur
1959 births
Living people